Classic Themes Redux EP is the first extended play by American film director and composer John Carpenter. It was released on June 17, 2016, through Sacred Bones Records. The extended play was created in collaboration with Carpenter's son Cody Carpenter and his godson Daniel Davies.

Track listing

"Halloween" b/w "Escape from New York" and "Assault on Precinct 13" b/w "The Fog" were released on 12" vinyl.

Personnel
 John Carpenter – composition, performance
 Cody Carpenter – performance
 Daniel Davies – performance, mixing
 Ryan Nasci - mixing on "Halloween"
 Jay Shaw – design

References

External links

 

2016 EPs